The Queen's Chapel (officially, The Queen's Chapel St. James Palace and previously the German Chapel) is a chapel in central London, England, that was designed by Inigo Jones and built between 1623 and 1625 as an external adjunct to St. James's Palace for the Roman Catholic queen Henrietta Maria. It is one of the facilities of the British monarch's personal religious establishment, the Chapel Royal, but should not be confused with the 1540 building also known as the Chapel Royal, which is within the palace and just across Marlborough Road. It is a Grade I listed building.

History
The Queen's Chapel was built as a Roman Catholic chapel at a time when the construction of churches for that denomination was otherwise prohibited in England, and was used by Charles I's French queen Henrietta Maria, who imported chapel furnishings from France. During the English Civil War it was used as a stable. It was refurbished in 1662, and again in the 1680s by Christopher Wren. From the 1690s the chapel was used by the Continental Protestant courtiers of William and Mary. In 1781 the chapel was given over to German friends of George I who had moved to England with him. The chapel was then called the German Chapel. On 17 September 1782 the German organist Augustus Frederic Christopher Kollmann began work at the Royal German Chapel and he was there for the rest of his life. He was succeeded by his son George Augustus Kollmann and his daughter Johanna Sophia Kollmann who died in 1849.

It became a Chapel Royal again in 1938.

The chapel was built as an integral part of St James's Palace, but when the adjacent private apartments of the monarch burned down in 1809 they were not replaced, and in 1856–57 Marlborough Road was laid out between the palace and the Queen's Chapel. The result is that physically the chapel now appears to be more part of the Marlborough House complex than of St James's Palace.

The body of Queen Elizabeth, the Queen Mother, lay at the Queen's Chapel for several days in 2002, during the preparations for her lying-in-state in Westminster Hall before her ceremonial funeral.

Architecture

The brick building is rendered to appear as if it were stone built. It was built in a Palladian style. It has gable ends with pediments. The interior vault is gilded and painted.

Gallery

See also
 Savoy Chapel

References

Further reading
The Buildings of England London 6: Westminster (2003) pages 587–88.
  (note services page not updated since 2018)

External links

1625 establishments in England
Roman Catholic churches completed in 1625
Chapels in London
Church of England church buildings in the City of Westminster
Grade I listed churches in the City of Westminster
Inigo Jones buildings
Royal buildings in London
London, Queen's Chapel
London, Queen's Chapel
17th-century churches in the United Kingdom
St James's
Henrietta Maria